Oiseau was a 32-gun frigate  of the French Navy.

Career 
In 1772, Oiseau was under Captain De Plas, and attached to the Escadre d'évolution under Orvilliers.

From 1773 to 1775, she was attached to the 64-gun Roland for the Second voyage of Kerguelen, under Lieutenant Rosnevet. The Baie de l'Oiseau was named in her honour.

In 1775, she was again attached to the Escadre d'évolution, this time under Captain Bausset and Admiral Guichen. In 1777, she was part of the fleet of Du Chaffault, captained by Roquefeuil-Montpeyroux.

Oiseau too part in the Battle of Ushant on 27 July 1778. On 31 January 1779, as she escorted a convoy from Brest to Saint-Malo, Oiseau encountered the British 32-gun frigate HMS Apollo. The captain of Oiseau, Tarade, signaled the cutter Expéditive to lead the convoy, and detached to attack Apollo. In the subsequent battle, Oiseau lost her foretop, and struck her colours.

Sources and references 
 Notes

Citations

Bibliography
 
 

External links
 

Frigates of the French Navy
Ships built in France
1769 ships